The Pure Gold Network is a network of radio stations owned and operated by ARN.

Stations
As of 1 July 2022, the Pure Gold network consists of five radio stations.

Networked shows 
 JAM Nation with Jonesy & Amanda
 The Christian O'Connell Show (except Adelaide)
 Somehow Related with Dave O'Neil and Glenn Robbins (except Adelaide)

Digital radio
The Pure Gold Network simulcasts each station in the network on Digital Radio in their local markets. Prior to the merger of iheartradio they also broadcast Pure Gold 80's, featuring 1980s music, Pure Gold 90's, featuring 1990s music, and, in a joint venture with the KIIS Network, the adult contemporary-formatted Chemist Warehouse Remix.

External links
Pure Gold website

Australian Radio Network
Australian radio networks